Toy Lake is a lake on Vancouver Island north of Great Central Lake and east of Oshinow Lake.

See also
List of lakes of British Columbia

References

Alberni Valley
Lakes of Vancouver Island
Strathcona Provincial Park
Clayoquot Land District